Anguttuaq (ᐊᖑᑦᑐᐊᖅ) formerly Beacon Island is an uninhabited island located in the Qikiqtaaluk Region, Nunavut, Canada.

Other islands in the immediate vicinity include: Lavoie Island, Wishart Island, Nuvursirpaaraaluk Island, Lee Island, Forder Island, Poodlatee Island, Uugalautiit Island, Black Bluff Island, Aulassivik Island, Ijjurittiak Island, Ivisaat Island, Glasgow Island, Juet Island, and High Bluff Island.

See also
 Beacon Island (Hudson Strait)
 Beacon Island (Ungava Bay)
 Upajjana, formerly Beacon Island

References

Islands of Baffin Island
Islands of Hudson Strait
Uninhabited islands of Qikiqtaaluk Region